Ferdinand Casimir II of Isenburg-Wächtersbach was a German count of Isenburg-Wächtersbach, and the son of Ferdinand Casimir I of Isenburg-Wächtersbach. His countship lasted from 1778 until 1780, and the county itself lasted from 1673 to 1806 in the central Holy Roman Empire, until it was mediatised to Isenburg.

Counts of Isenburg-Wächtersbach